The Double Husband (German: Der doppelte Ehemann) is a 1955 West German comedy film directed by Ferdinand Dörfler and starring Joe Stöckel, Grethe Weiser and Ingrid Pan.  It was shot at the Bavaria Studios in Munich.

Synopsis
Grethe Koblanck and her husband own a successful fur fashion house in Munich. However she suspects of him of flirtation with younger woman including the South American Dolores. She employs a hidden camera to keep an eye on him, but discovering this he gets a doppelganger to take his place. Things go wrong when it turns out his double also has an interest in attractive woman.

Cast
 Joe Stöckel as Otto Koblanck / August Schmitt
 Grethe Weiser as 	Grethe Koblanck
 Ingrid Pan as 	Inge Koblanck
 Peer Schmidt as Heinz Krämer
 Georg Lehn as 	Fritz Schneider
 Ingeborg Cornelius as Dolores Gonzales
 Oliver Hassencamp as 	Fernando Gonzales
 Ingrid Lutz as Barsängerin Kitty
 Erika von Thellmann as 	Klothilde Kümmerling, Directrice
 Ellen Hille as Klara Berger
 Alfred Schrempf as 	Paul - ihr Zwilling
 Christine Koschkar as 	Linchen - ihr Zwilling
 Carla Hagen as Anna, Mädchen
 Joseph Offenbach as 	Gerichtsvollzieher
 Wastl Witt as Taxichauffeur
 Elise Aulinger as Fürsorgebeamtin
 Eduard Linkers as 	Bachwitz
 Werner Lieven as 	Hotelportier
 Leo Siedler as 	Hotelmanager

References

Bibliography
 Bock, Hans-Michael & Bergfelder, Tim. The Concise CineGraph. Encyclopedia of German Cinema. Berghahn Books, 2009.

External links 
 

1955 films
1955 comedy films
German comedy films
West German films
1950s German-language films
Films directed by Ferdinand Dörfler
1950s German films
Films shot at Bavaria Studios
Films set in Munich

de:Der doppelte Ehemann